Richard, Count of Montfort, Vertus and Étampes (c. 1396 – 2 June 1438) was the eighth child and youngest son of John IV, Duke of Brittany, and his third wife, Joan of Navarre. Not much is known of his life, except that he was the father of Francis II, Duke of Brittany. In his lifetime he held many titles and positions; he was appointed captain-general of Guyenne and Poitou in 1419, became comte d'Étampes  and  seigneur de Palluau et de Châteaumur de Thouarcé, de Bourgomeaux-l'Evêque et de Ligron on 8 May 1423, and Count of Mantes in October 1425.

Marriage and issue 

In 1423 he married Marguerite d'Orléans, daughter of Louis, duc d'Orléans and Valentina Visconti, a daughter of Giangaleazzo Visconti, Duke of Milan and his first wife, Isabella of Valois.

The bride received  the county of Vertus as dowry, thus Richard became count in the right of his wife. She and Richard had:
 Marie of Brittany, Abbess of Fontevraud 
 Francis II, Duke of Brittany married Margaret of Brittany 
 Isabeau
 Catherine of Brittany, married William of Orange in 1438.
 Marguerite of Brittany, nun at Longchamp
 Madeleine of Brittany

Richard also had a natural daughter by a mistress.

Count of Étampes
On his marriage in 1423, Richard became comte de Vertus-en-Champagne et de Bénon. He also became baron de Clisson, seigneur de Courtenay, de Piffonds, de Houdan et de l'Epine-Gaudin in 1423, and châtelain de Renac et de Bois-Raoul near Redon in 1424.

Richard became Count of Étampes in the right of his wife.  She inherited the rights to the county from her father and was formally granted them by King Charles VII of France. However, their claim was disputed by Philip the Good, Duke of Burgundy. Presumably, Philip sought to avenge his father's death by disrupting Charles's reign; Charles was most probably responsible for the late duke's assassination in 1419. Philip occupied the duchy and held it personally until 1434, after which he gave it to his cousin, John II, Count of Nevers. Nevertheless, the County was returned to Richard in September 1435.

Other relations
Richard had many varying and complex relationships with French and English royalty.

His mother Joan later married Henry IV of England, and became Queen of England. Richard's stepbrother and Henry IV's son and successor, Henry V of England, would later claim the throne of France and re-initiate the Hundred Years' War and marry Richard's wife's paternal cousin, Catherine of Valois. His step-nephew, King Henry VI of England, succeeded his grandfather and Richard's wife's uncle, Charles VI to the French throne, as a rival to Dauphin Charles. Coincidentally, Henry's wife, Margaret of Anjou, was the step-daughter of Jeanne de Laval, who was a granddaughter of Richard's brother, John VI, Duke of Brittany. Richard was also distantly related to the Courtenays, who were also descended from Louis VI, through his youngest son, Peter I of Courtenay.

Succession
Richard died on 2 June 1438.

Both of Richard's older brothers had succeeded their father, John IV, as Duke of Brittany. By the time of Richard's death, he had predeceased the remaining claimants to his father's title, save his only legitimate son, Francis II.   As a result, Francis II succeeded Richard, his father, as Count of Étampes and Arthur III, his uncle, as Duke of Brittany.

Ancestry

References

Sources

External links
 Medieval Lands: A prosopography of medieval European noble and royal families by Charles Cawley

1396 births
1438 deaths
House of Dreux
Counts of Étampes
15th-century Breton people
French people of English descent